Liam Harrison may refer to:
 Liam Harrison (kickboxer) (born 1985), English Muay Thai kickboxer
 Liam Harrison (musician) (born 1953), Irish musician and songwriter
 Liam Harrison (rugby league) (born 1983), Irish rugby league player